N’Diaye Ramatoulaye Diallo is a Malian politician and entrepreneur.  She was the Minister of Handicrafts, Tourism and Culture in Mali from 2014 to 2020.

She is the daughter of Diallo Lalla Sy, a Malian politician, the former Minister of Employment and Public Service.

Career 
She cut her teeth in the private sector where as founder of the earliest public relations agency (since 1998), she advises and supports the development of several private companies and affixes her mark of creativity on the major international events that have marked the Malian scene between 2000 and 2010. Her political emergence is rooted in the fight for citizen mobilization for of the massive exercise of the right to vote, particularly in a context of citizen disaffection, discrediting of political elites and general disenchantment of the Malian populations. She then entered the political arena and in 2013 became the deputy director of the presidential campaign for the election of Ibrahim Boubacar Keïta, who then embodied the hope for change and national sovereignty. Appointed Minister of Handicrafts, Tourism and Culture, she designed and implemented a vast program entitled Timbuktu Renaissance and passes the first law on intellectual property, which recognizes the status of artists and their right to live. of their work. She also launched a program to renew festivals in Mali. She launched in 2019 the initiative Mirii Blon in order to gather cultural actors and create synergy between the actors of the field and help culture blossoms in Mali. At internationally level, she is also the initiator of the first African Cultural Governance Barometer, a tool that aims to operationalize the Charter for the Cultural Renaissance of the African Union. She was a Special Advisor to UAE for Dubai Expo 2020 for Africa and Francophone countries.  She is currently the founder and CEO of GGWoA Foundation.

Education 
After graduating in 1993, she graduated in 1996 with the International Bachelor of Arts in Communication and Marketing from Barry University in Miami and in 1998 the Master in Marketing and Advertising from Columbus University. She also holds a postgraduate degree in strategic management and economic intelligence from Economic Warfare School of Paris.

Recognition 
The new government of Mali in April 2017 renewed her appointment as the Minister of Culture in a statement that suggested that she was rewarded with the renewal of her mandate because of her previous work that included the reduction of the staffing at her department and adoption of a consensual textual agreement that should allow artists to live decently of their copyrights.

She was awarded Officer of the National Order of Mali, Commander of the National Order of Merit of France and she is holder of the Commemorative Medal of the 70th anniversary of UNESCO.

References 

Malian politicians